Killah may be:

 an alternative spelling of Qila, a term found in South Asian placenames
 a slang spelling of "Killer", found among others in the nicknames of several American AND African rappers associated with the Wu-Tang Clan:
 Ghostface Killah (born 1970)
 Masta Killah, (born 1969)
 Killah Priest (born 1970)
KILLAH_DA_RAPPER (BORN 1996)

See also 
 Killa (disambiguation)